Enova Energy Corporation, through its subsidiary Enova Power Corp., is an electric utility and distributor that serves most municipalities in the Regional Municipality of Waterloo in Ontario. It is a municipally owned corporation with shares held by the municipalities to varying degrees.

As of September 2022, it is the seventh-largest electricity distributor in Ontario by number of customers served. In addition to its electric distribution and utility services, Enova Power provides sub-metering through its subsidiary Alliance Metering Solutions.

Formation 

Kitchener-Wilmot Hydro Inc. (which previously served Kitchener and Wilmot) and Waterloo North Hydro Inc. (which previously served Waterloo, Wellesley, and Woolwich) were founded in 1978 through mergers of smaller utilities. In 2017, following a provincial review of local electric utilities and distributors, the City of Waterloo, the Township of Woolwich, and the Township of Wellesley proposed three options for the future of the utility: continuing to operate Waterloo North Hydro as is, merging with a local and equal partner, or buying another distributor outright. Plans to merge Waterloo North Hydro with Kitchener-Wilmot Hydro were discussed in October 2021. In December 2021, each of the five municipal councils had approved the merger, and the merger was approved following a review by the Ontario Energy Board. The two utilities officially merged on September 12, 2022.

Corporate organization 
Enova is governed through Enova HoldCo and Enova WiresCo. Enova HoldCo has a 13-member board of directors, 7 of whom are independent and 6 represent municipalities (3 from Kitchener, 2 from Waterloo, 1 from Woolwich). Enova WiresCo has a 9-member board of directors, 5 of whom are independent and 4 represent municipalities (2 from Kitchener, 1 from Waterloo, 1 from Woolwich). A representative from Wellesley and a representative from Wilmot are observers for both boards.

See also 
 List of Canadian electric utilities

References

External links
 

2022 establishments in Ontario
Companies based in Kitchener, Ontario
Canadian companies established in 2022
Companies owned by municipalities of Canada
Electric power companies of Canada
Municipal government of Kitchener, Ontario